Devotional Songs is a studio album by Nusrat Fateh Ali Khan and Party released in 1992.  The music is Sufi devotional music known as Qawwali.  The album was included in the book 1001 Albums You Must Hear Before You Die.

Track listing 

 "Allah Hoo Allah Hoo" - 7:59
 "Yaad-E-Nabi Gulshan Mehka" - 7:37
 "Haq Ali Ali Haq" - 7:26
 "Ali Maula Ali Maula Ali Dam Dam" - 7:44
 "Mast Nazroon Se Allah Bachchae" - 6:24
 "Ni Main Jogi De Naal" - 8:08

References

External links 
Grooveshark streaming version of "Devotional Songs".

1992 albums
Nusrat Fateh Ali Khan albums